John Walker (29 May 1781 – 1 May 1859) was an English inventor who invented the friction match.

Life
Walker was born in Stockton-on-Tees, County Durham, on 1781. He went to the local grammar school and was afterwards apprenticed to Watson Alcock, the principal surgeon of the town, serving him as an assistant. He had, however, an aversion to surgical operations, and had to leave the profession, turning instead to chemistry. After studying at Durham and York, he set up a small business as a chemist and druggist at 59 High Street, Stockton, around 1818.
Walker died in Stockton on 1 May 1859 and was buried in the grounds of St Mary's Church in Norton, near Stockton.

Walkers Friction Match

He developed an interest  in trying to find a means of obtaining fire easily. Several chemical mixtures were already known which would ignite by a sudden explosion, but it had not been found possible to transmit the flame to a slow-burning substance like wood. While Walker was preparing a lighting mixture on one occasion, a match which had been dipped in it took fire by an accidental friction upon the hearth. He at once appreciated the practical value of the discovery, and started making friction matches. They consisted of wooden splints or sticks of cardboard coated with sulphur and tipped with a mixture of sulphide of antimony, chlorate of potash, and gum, the sulphur serving to communicate the flame to the wood.

The price of a box of 50 matches was one shilling. With each box was supplied a piece of sandpaper, folded double, through which the match had to be drawn to ignite it. He did not name the matches "Congreves" in honour of the inventor and rocket pioneer, Sir William Congreve as it is sometimes stated. The congreves were the invention of Charles Sauria, a French chemistry student at the time. He did not divulge the exact composition of his matches.

Two and a half years after Walker's invention was made public, Isaac Holden arrived, independently, at the same idea of coating wooden splinters with sulphur. The exact date of his discovery, according to his own statement, was October 1829. Previously to this date, Walker's sales-book contains an account of no fewer than 250 sales of friction matches, the first entry bearing the date 7 April 1827. Already comfortably well off, he refused to patent his invention, despite being encouraged to by Michael Faraday and others, making it freely available for anyone to make. He received neither fame nor wealth for his invention, although he was able to retire some years later. The credit for his invention was attributed only after his death.

Following the ideas laid out by the French chemist, Charles Sauria, who in 1830 invented the first phosphorus-based match by replacing the antimony sulfide in Walker's matches with white phosphorus, matches were first patented in the United States in 1836, in Massachusetts, being smaller in size and safer to use. White phosphorus was later banned for public usage because of its toxicity. Today's modern safety matches were created by the Swedish chemist, Gustaf Erik Pasch.

References

External links

"John Walker & The Match", This is Stockton
"John Walker's Friction Light", A History of the World in 100 Objects, BBC 

1781 births
1859 deaths
People from Stockton-on-Tees
English chemists
English inventors